Jamaal James (born September 4, 1988) is a former professional  800m runner from Trinidad and Tobago he represented his country internationally at the age group and elite level. James graduated from Louisiana State University(LSU) in 2010 with a degree in Communication Studies. At LSU James earned both National Collegiate Athletic Association (NCAA) Indoor All-American and South Eastern Conference (SEC) honors between 2007-2010. His personal record is 1:46.57 achieved in Ninove, Belgium. He is also the national junior 800m record holder for his country with the time of 1:47.00.

Collegiate career 
He ran for Louisiana State University as a member of the LSU Tigers track and field team, and became a 3x All American, 2x South Eastern Conference (SEC) Champion and 6x ALL SEC performer, from 2007-2010.

International competitions

References

External Links 
World Athletics Bio

Trinidad and Tobago male middle-distance runners
Living people
1988 births
LSU Tigers track and field athletes
Commonwealth Games competitors for Trinidad and Tobago
Athletes (track and field) at the 2014 Commonwealth Games
Competitors at the 2006 Central American and Caribbean Games